Rajashree is an Indian actress known for her works in Tamil cinema, Telugu cinema and television. She made her debut in Bharathiraja's 1994 Tamil film Karuththamma playing the lead character. Since then she has appeared in over sixty films in a variety of roles.

Career
Actress Rajashree made her debut in Tamil Cinema with Bharathiraja's Karuthamma. Winning laurels for her prodigious performance, she continued getting on with fantastic shows in Sethu, Nandha, Run, Manasellam, Vettaiyaadu Vilaiyaadu. Rajashree has spelled prominent roles around 57 films in Telugu and Tamil. Apart from Silver Screen, the actress leaped with best credits in TV series Aalayam, Agal Vilakku, Mandhira Vasal and Sivamayam.

Personal life
Rajashree's sister, Bobby, also appeared in films as an actress.

Rajashree married Ansari Raja, a Muslim and proprietor of "Body Shape Gym" after being in love for some time. It was a customary marriage according to Hindu-Muslim religion that was attended by their family members and close friends. But, however the couple split after living together for just one month.

In 2010, she married computer engineer Bujankar Rao in a secret ceremony in Vijayawada. The wedding took place at the Kanaka Durga temple and was attended by just a few family and friends of the couple.

Filmography

Television
Serials

Web Series

References

External links
 

Indian film actresses
Actresses in Tamil cinema
Living people
Actresses in Telugu cinema
Indian television actresses
Actresses in Tamil television
20th-century Indian actresses
21st-century Indian actresses
Year of birth missing (living people)
Actresses in Malayalam cinema
Actresses in Kannada cinema
Actresses in Malayalam television
Actresses in Telugu television